Edward O'Malley may refer to:

Sir Edward Loughlin O'Malley (1842–1932), British lawyer, judge and unsuccessful political candidate
Edward R. O'Malley (1863–1935), American lawyer, politician and judge
Ed O'Malley, American American non-profit executive, author and politician